Trichomonadida is an order of anaerobic protists, included with the parabasalids.  Members of this order are referred to as trichomonads.

Some organisms in this order include:
Trichomonas vaginalis, an organism living inside the vagina of humans
Dientamoeba fragilis, parasitic ameboid in humans
Histomonas meleagridis, parasite that causes blackhead disease in poultry
Mixotricha paradoxa, a symbiotic organism inside termites, host of endosymbionts

Anatomy 

Species in this order typically have four to six flagella at the cell's apical pole, one of which is recurrent - that is, it runs along a surface wave, giving the aspect of an undulating membrane.  Like other parabasalids, they typically have an axostyle, a pelta, a costa, and parabasal bodies.  In Histomonas only one flagellum and a reduced axostyle are found, and in Dientamoeba, both are absent.

Behavior 

Most species are either parasites or other endosymbionts of animals.

Trichomonads reproduce by a special form of longitudinal fission, leading to large numbers of trophozoites in a relatively short time.  Cysts never form, so transmission from one host to another is always based on direct contact between the sites they occupy.

Treatment 

The preferred treatment for trichomonad infection is Metronidazole.

References

External links
General info

Metamonads